The protected areas of Namibia include its national parks and reserves. With the 2010 declaration of Dorob National Park, Namibia became the first and only country to have its entire coastline protected through a national parks network. Protected areas are subdivided into game reserves and/or nature reserves, such as special protected area, wilderness areas, natural areas, and development areas. There are also recreation reserves. Facilities in the national parks are operated by Namibia Wildlife Resorts. Over 19% of Namibia is protected, an area of some 130,000 square kilometres. However, the Ministry of Environment & Tourism auctions limited hunting rights within its protected areas. The Namibia Nature Foundation, an NGO, was established in 1987 to raise and administer funds for the conservation of wildlife and protected area management. Communal Wildlife Conservancies in Namibia help promote sustainable natural resource management by giving local communities rights to wildlife management and tourism.

National parks

Nature reserves

Cape Cross Seal Reserve

Cape Cross is a protected area under the name Cape Cross Seal Reserve. The reserve is the home of one of the largest colonies of Cape fur seals in the world.
Cape Cross is one of two main sites in Namibia where seals are culled, partly for selling their hides and partly for protecting the fish stock. The economic impact of seals on the fish resources is controversial: While a government-initiated study found that seal colonies consume more fish than the entire fishing industry can catch, animal protection society Seal Alert South Africa estimated less than 0.3% losses to commercial fisheries.

Daan Viljoen Game Reserve

The Daan Viljoen Game Reserve is a game reserve near Windhoek, situated in the hill area of Khomas Hochland. Over 200 species are found here, typical of the Namibian highlands, including Hartmann's mountain zebra, blue wildebeest, kudu, gemsbok, springbok, impala, rockrunner, white-tailed shrike, Monteiro's hornbill, Bradfield's swift, Rüppell's parrot and Carp's tit. In the 1990s a number of indigenous people in the area were resettled by the Namibian government. The park has many walking paths and allows tourists to travel around by themselves. It closed in 2010 to allow for the construction of the Sun Karros Daan Viljoen Lodge but has since reopened.

Hardap Recreation Resort
Hardap Recreation Resort surrounds Namibia's largest Hardap Dam, which opened in 1964 as a recreational area. As Reader's Digest said though, "ironically, although Hardap is one of Namibia's best-known resorts, the nature reserve is unfamiliar to the large majority of visitors." It contains over 100 species of birds.

Popa Game Park
The Popa Game Park is a small park where the Popa water fall, which drops by only 3 m over rapids on the Okavango River, is situated. Its thunderous sound is heard over a long distance. Bird species are a common sight and hippopotamus inhabit the river.

Communal Area Conservancies

Ehirovipuka Conservancy
Ehirovipuka Conservancy is a gazetted communal area conservancy situated in the Kunene Region. The reserve consists of mainly semi-desert and savannah woodlands, and the Ombonde River flows through the area. Animals living there include African bush elephant, African leopard, lion, South African cheetah, common eland, kudu, duiker, warthog, steenbok, gemsbok, Angolan giraffe, springbok, South African ostrich, and Hartman's mountain zebra. It contains a meat processing plant supplying tourist lodges. Other economic activity includes forestry and the sale of traditional craft products. Ehirovipuka Conservancy received a 20-year tourism concession in 2010.

Private Game Reserves

Erindi Private Game Reserve 

The Erindi Game Reserve ('Erendi' meaning "Place of Water") is in the heart land of Namibia and covers an area of 70,000ha. It is located 40 km to the east of Omaruru town and lies between the Erongo Mountain Rhino Sanctuary Trust of Namibia and the Omatako Mountains. Habitats recorded are of mountainous areas, riverine vegetation, inselbergs and grassland savannahs. Leopard research is an important activity in the reserve. It also has a notable population of south-western black rhinoceros, lion, brown hyena, leopard and cheetah.

Gamsberg Nature Reserve
Gamsberg Nature Reserve is in central Namibia, located west of Rehoboth.

Naankuse Wildlife Sanctuary

The Naankuse Wildlife Sanctuary covers an area of 3,200 ha which is a sanctuary for orphaned animals. Some of the animals tended are lions, leopards, cheetahs, wild dogs, caracals and baboons. The animals reported in the wild of the sanctuary are giraffe, zebra, kudu, hartebeest, springbok, eland, jackal and also wild cheetahs and leopards. The sanctuary has developed a new method to identify cheetahs in the wild based on their paw prints. This is done in association with Wildtrack, AfriCat and Chester Zoo.

NamibRand Nature Reserve
The NamibRand Nature Reserve is a private nature reserve (largest such reserve in Africa) covering an area of 202,200 ha with four habitats of dunes and sandy plains, inselbergs and mountains gravel plains, and sand and gravel plains interface. The largest number of oryx (gemsbok or oryx) (3,200) and Antidorcas marsupialis (springbok) (12,400) are the dominant mammal species in the reserve. 150 bird species of birds are also reported. Other wild animals which are predators, recorded in the reserve are leopard, spotted and brown hyena, black-backed jackal, aardwolf, bat-eared fox, Cape fox, Southern African wildcat, caracal and genet.

Tsaobis Leopard Park
The Tsaobis Leopard Park is the only nature reserve in Namibia to conserve leopards in particular. Situated south of Karibib and east of Swakopmund, it was established in 1969.

Sandfontein Nature Reserve 
Sandfontein Nature Reserve is located in southern Namibia near the Orange River. The nature reserve covers an area over 200,000 acres and is home to many species of animal including aardvark, aardwolf, baboon, black backed jackal, cape clawless otter, eland, gemsbok (oryx), giraffe, Hartmann's zebra, klipspringer, kudu, leopard, ostrich, red hartebeest, rock hyrax, springbok, steenbok and wild donkey.

Transboundary Protected Areas

The protection is not necessarily limited to inside the borders of Namibia. In 2007 the Ai-Ais/Richtersveld Transfrontier Park, an international peace park, was created through the joint management of the Ai-Ais Hot Springs park, which includes parts of Fish River Canyon, and the Richtersveld National Park in neighbouring South Africa. Fauna includes rock hyrax, ground squirrel, jackal buzzard and Hartmann's mountain zebra.

In 2006, the countries of Namibia, Angola, Zimbabwe, Zambia, and Botswana signed an agreement creating the Kavango–Zambezi Transfrontier Conservation Area, a vast expanse of land designated primarily "'to establish a world-class transfrontier conservation area and tourism destination in the Okavango and Zambezi river-basin regions within the context of sustainable development", by linking different habitats and allowing animals the freedom of movement throughout this region of Africa.

In addition, there is ongoing discussion between the governments of Namibia and Angola regarding the creation of a trans-border coastal park, formed from the concatenation of the Skeleton Coast National Park, and Angola's Iona National Park.

References

External links
  of the Republic of Namibia, Ministry of Environment & Tourism

 
Environment of Namibia
Geography of Namibia